Nina Petrovna Rocheva (Selyunina; 13 October 1948 – 8 January 2022) was a Soviet cross-country skier who competed from 1978 to 1980. She won a silver medal in the 4 × 5 km relay at the 1980 Winter Olympics in Lake Placid, New York.

Rocheva also earned two medals in the 4 × 5 km relay at the world ski championships: gold (under her maiden name Selyunina at the 1974 Championships in Falun, Sweden, and bronze at the 1978 World Championships in Lahti, Finland.

She was married to the Soviet Olympic champion in cross-country skiing Vasily (Pavlovich) Rochev, she is the mother of Vasily (Vasilyevich) Rochev, also Olympic medalist in that discipline. She died on 8 January 2022, at the age of 73.

Cross-country skiing results

Olympic Games
 1 medal – (1 silver)

World Championships
 2 medals – (1 gold, 1 bronze)

References

External links
Database Olympic Profile
World Championship results 

1948 births
2022 deaths
Soviet female cross-country skiers
Cross-country skiers at the 1976 Winter Olympics
Cross-country skiers at the 1980 Winter Olympics
Olympic cross-country skiers of the Soviet Union
Medalists at the 1980 Winter Olympics
Olympic silver medalists for the Soviet Union
Olympic medalists in cross-country skiing
FIS Nordic World Ski Championships medalists in cross-country skiing
Universiade medalists in cross-country skiing
Universiade silver medalists for the Soviet Union
Competitors at the 1972 Winter Universiade